The BBVA Foundation Frontiers of Knowledge Awards are an international award programme recognizing significant contributions in the areas of scientific research and cultural creation. The categories that make up the Frontiers of Knowledge Awards respond to the knowledge map of the present age. As well as the fundamental knowledge that is at their core, they address developments in information and communication technologies, and interactions between biology and medicine, ecology and conservation biology, climate change, economics, humanities and social sciences, and, finally, contemporary musical creation and performance. Specific categories are reserved for developing knowledge fields of critical relevance to confront central challenges of the 21st century, as in the case of the two environmental awards.

The awards were established in 2008, with the first set of winners receiving their prizes in 2009. The BBVA Foundation – belonging to financial group BBVA – is partnered in the scheme by the Spanish National Research Council (CSIC), the country's premier public research organization.

Categories
There are eight award categories: basic science, biology and biomedicine, climate change, ecology and conservation biology, information and communications technologies, economics, finance and management, music and opera, humanities and social sciences (a new category in the 11th edition). Previously, in the first 10 editions, there was a category in development cooperation.

Juries
Eight juries, one for each category, analyze the nominations put forward by international academic and research institutions. 
To reach their decision, the juries meet during January and February in the Marqués de Salamanca Palace, Madrid headquarters of the BBVA Foundation. 
The day after the jury's decision, the name of the winners(s) and the achievements that earned them the award are revealed at an announcement event in the same location.

Ceremony

The awards are presented in June each year at a ceremony held, from the 11th edition, in the Euskalduna Palace at Bilbao, in the Basque Country.

BBVA Foundation
The BBVA Foundation engages in the promotion of research, advanced training and the transmission of knowledge to society, focusing on the emerging issues of the 21st century in five areas: Environment, Biomedicine and Health, Economy and Society, Basic Sciences and Technology, and Arts and Humanities. The BBVA Foundation designs, develops and finances research projects in these areas; facilitates advanced specialist training through grants, courses, seminars and workshops; organizes award schemes for researchers and professionals whose work has contributed significantly to the advancement of knowledge; and communicates and disseminates such new knowledge through publications, databases, lecture series, debates, exhibitions and audiovisual and electronic media.

Prizes
Each BBVA Foundation Frontiers of Knowledge laureate receives a commemorative artwork, a diploma and a cash prize of 400,000 euros per category. Awards may not be granted posthumously, and when an award is shared, its monetary amount is divided equally among the recipients.

The commemorative artwork is created by Madrid sculptor Blanca Muñoz, B.A. in Fine Arts from the Universidad Complutense de Madrid. Holder of scholarships at Calcografia Nazionale (1989), awarded by the Italian Government, at the Spanish Royal Academy in Rome (1990), and in Mexico City (1992), awarded by the Mexican Department of Foreign Affairs, her numerous distinctions include the 1999 National Print Prize.

Laureates

References

External links
 BBVA Foundation

Science and technology awards
Awards established in 2008